Octavio is a Spanish language masculine given name. In the Portuguese language the given name Octavio or Octávio is also found, but in Portuguese the normal spelling is Otávio. It is also used as a surname in the Philippines.

Individuals
 Octavio Dotel, Major League Baseball relief pitcher
 Octavio Paz Lozano, Mexican writer, poet, and diplomat, and the winner of the 1990 Nobel Prize for Literature
 Octavio Ocampo, Mexican artist
 Octavio Vazquez, Spanish-American composer
 Octavio Zambrano, Ecuadorian soccer coach
 Octavio Lugo, American entrepreneur, founder of StormTek, banker, businessman

Portuguese and Brazilian

 Octávio Trompowsky, Brazilian chess player
 Marco Octávio informal name of Brazilian beach soccer coach
 Octávio Mateus, Portuguese paleontologist

Fictional
 A character in Scarface (1983 film)
 A character in Eating Out 2: Sloppy Seconds
 List of characters in King of the Hill#Other recurring characters, a character in King of the Hill
 List of Sly Cooper characters#Octavio, a character from the video game Sly 3: Honor Among Thieves
 The final boss of Splatoon
 Octavio Silva, also known as Octane, a playable character in Apex Legends

Film and TV
 Octavio, a 2011 film by José Antonio Torres (director)

Other
SD Octavio Vigo, a Spanish handball club based in Vigo, Galicia, Spain.
  The name given by Jimi Hendrix to an effects pedal used with electric guitars, invented by Jim Morris of Kelsey-Morris Sound, London.  A later version was called an Octavia (effects pedal)

See also
 Octavo (disambiguation)
 Ottavio (disambiguation), the Italian equivalent of Octavio